Kerry Patrick Brady (born August 27, 1963) is a former American football placekicker in the National Football League for the Dallas Cowboys, Indianapolis Colts, and Buffalo Bills. He played college football at the University of Hawaii.

Early years
Brady attended Hudson's Bay High School in Vancouver, Washington graduating in 1981. He played soccer at Portland Community College in 1981-82 and won two Northwest championships, his soccer coach, Rudi Sommer, watched him kick 60 yard field goals with soccer balls at Civic Stadium and encouraged him to pursue a career in kicking footballs. He accepted a football scholarship from the University of Hawaii.

He was a backup behind Richard Spelman as a sophomore and junior. As a senior, he was named the starter at placekicker, making 16 out of 20 field goals (80%), 20 out of 22 extra points (90.9%) and 68 points.

Professional career

Dallas Cowboys
Brady was signed as an undrafted free agent by the Dallas Cowboys after the 1987 NFL Draft on April 1, who were looking for a replacement for kicker Rafael Septien. On August 25, he was waived after falling behind Roger Ruzek and Luis Zendejas on the depth chart.

After the NFLPA strike was declared on the third week of the 1987 season, those games were canceled (reducing the 16 game season to 15) and the NFL decided that the games would be played with replacement players. He was re-signed to be a part of the Dallas replacement team that was given the mock name "Rhinestone Cowboys" by the media to replace Zendejas. He played one game against the Washington Redskins, where he made one extra point. He was released after the strike ended on October 20.

Buffalo Bills
On April 5, 1988, he was signed as a free agent by the Buffalo Bills to compete against Scott Norwood. He was released on August 23.

Indianalis Colts
On September 22, 1988, he was signed as a free agent by the Indianapolis Colts to handle the kickoffs, while starter Dean Biasucci focused only on making field goals on the depth chart.

Green Bay Packers
On April 21, 1989, he was signed as a free agent by the Green Bay Packers to compete for he starting job against rookie Chris Jacke. He was released on August 28.

Buffalo Bills
On September 22, 1989, he was signed as a free agent by the Buffalo Bills to handle the kickoffs. In 1990, he was signed to compete against Scott Norwood. He was placed on the injured reserve list on August 28.

Personal life
Brady retired from football after four seasons and took a job in sales in the medical field. He is married to Christina Brady and has two children, Dakota and Dylan. Dylan was a placekicker at Brown University.

He currently lives in Long Beach, California and owns a medical device company manufacturing X-Ray aprons.

References

1963 births
Living people
Sportspeople from Vancouver, Washington
Players of American football from Washington (state)
American football placekickers
Dallas Cowboys players
Indianapolis Colts players
Buffalo Bills players
National Football League replacement players
Portland Community College
Hawaii Rainbow Warriors football players